Vellai Thamarai  is a soap opera that aired Monday through Friday on Sun TV from 23 January 2012 to 28 June 2013 for 359 episodes. The show starred Abhishek, Vasu Vikiram, Pushpalatha, Thanush and among others. It was produced by Abhinaya Creations Radha Krishnasamy, director by Mani Barathy and R. Dhandapaany.

Cast

 Abhishek as Kathir/Ganeshan
 Pushpalatha as Thamarai (Indhu and Kalaivani's mother)
 Vasu Vikram as Ashok (Professor sir)
 Nithya Ravindran as Ranganayaki (Ravi's mother and Kalaivani's grandmother)
 Raj Madhan in dual roles as 
Krishna (Ravi's father, Ranganayaki's husband and Kalaivani's grandfather) 
Ramanathan (Bhaskar's father)
 Dhanalakshmi as Indhumathi (Thamarai and Adhi's daughter)
 Ravi Chandran as Suryamoorthy (Thamarai's father)
 M. Bhanumathi
 Dhanush as Venkateshan (temple priest and Ganeshan's friend)
 Sangeetha as Thenmozhi (Anbumani's wife)
 Nesan as Inspector Anbumani
 M.L.A Thangaraj as Thangaraj (Suryamoorthy's elder brother)
 R.Ravi as Adithyan(Adhi) (Indhumathi's father)
 Veera as Lingam (Suryamoorthy's Henchman)
 C.V Ravishankar as Shankar (Suryamoorthy's assistant)
 Navindhar as Naveen
 Bobby Bilani as Udhay
 Girish as Udhay's father
 Shrihari
 Pirasanna
 Meenakshi

See also
 List of programs broadcast by Sun TV

References

External links
 Official Website 
 Sun TV on YouTube
 Sun TV Network 
 Sun Group 

Sun TV original programming
2012 Tamil-language television series debuts
Tamil-language television shows
2013 Tamil-language television series endings